Je suis Charlie (original title: L'humour à mort) is a 2015 French documentary film directed by Emmanuel Leconte and Daniel Leconte about the 2015 Île-de-France attacks. It was shown in the TIFF Docs section of the 2015 Toronto International Film Festival.

The documentary has been nominated for the F:ACT Award at the 2015 Copenhagen International Documentary Festival and for Best Documentary at the 2016 Jerusalem Film Festival.

References

External links
 

2015 films
2015 documentary films
French documentary films
2010s French-language films
Documentary films about terrorism
Charlie Hebdo shooting
2010s French films